The Tri-City Chili Peppers are a collegiate summer baseball team playing in the Coastal Plain League. The team plays its home games at Shepherd Stadium in Colonial Heights, Virginia. The team joined the league in 2020 but didn't play due to the COVID-19 pandemic. Their first ever game was played Friday, May 28, 2021 on the road against the Holly Springs Salamanders in North Carolina. Their first ever home game was played on Monday, May 31, 2021 against the Wilson Tobs.

References

External links
 Official Site
 Coastal Plain League

Coastal Plain League
Colonial Heights, Virginia
Amateur baseball teams in Virginia
2020 establishments in Virginia
Baseball teams established in 2020